Francis Edward Taylor (16 July 1901 – 1973) was an English professional footballer of the 1920s.

Career
Born in Wolverhampton, he played at inside forward. He played non-league football for Sunbeam Motors, and was briefly on the books at Port Vale. He joined Newport County for a three-year spell in 1923. He joined Gillingham from Bournemouth & Boscombe Athletic in 1928 and went on to make 29 appearances for the club in the Football League, scoring eight goals. He later played for Shrewsbury Town in the Birmingham & District League.

Career statistics
Source:

References

1901 births
1973 deaths
Footballers from Wolverhampton
English footballers
Association football inside forwards
Sunbeam Motors F.C. players
Port Vale F.C. players
Newport County A.F.C. players
AFC Bournemouth players
Gillingham F.C. players
Shrewsbury Town F.C. players
English Football League players